The Battle of Haarlemmermeer was a naval engagement fought on 26 May 1573, during the early stages of the Dutch War of Independence. It was fought on the waters of the Haarlemmermeer – a large lake which at the time was a prominent feature of North Holland (it would be drained in the 19th century).

A Spanish fleet and a fleet belonging to the city of Amsterdam (at the time still loyal to Spain), commanded by the Count of Bossu, fought a fleet of rebellious Dutch Geuzen, commanded by Marinus Brandt, who were trying to break the siege of Haarlem. After several hours of fighting, the Geuzen were forced to retreat.

Trivia

Amsterdam Schiphol Airport is situated in what used to be the Haarlemmermeer.

Citations and notes

References

Naval battles of the Eighty Years' War
Conflicts in 1573
1573 in the Habsburg Netherlands
Eighty Years' War (1566–1609)